Mr Galloway Goes to Washington: the Brit who set Congress straight about Iraq is a 2005 book by British politician George Galloway. The book concerned the actions of the United States in invading Iraq, the fallout and Galloway's 2005 appearance before the US senate.

Background
Galloway was a fierce opponent of the Invasion of Iraq, and was expelled from the Labour Party over a number of controversial comments. He subsequently became a leading member of the Respect Party and won the Bethnal Green and Bow constituency in the 2005 United Kingdom general election.
The Republican Party (US)-controlled Senate made a number of allegations that Galloway received personal benefits from Saddam Hussein. Galloway comparatively answers the allegations in the Senate committee.
The book was published by The New Press.

References

2005 non-fiction books
Books about politics of the United Kingdom
Books about politics of the United States
Books about foreign relations of the United Kingdom
Books about foreign relations of the United States
Books about the 2003 invasion of Iraq
Iraq War books
Books critical of conservatism in the United States
Books by George Galloway